These are the official results of the Men's Triple Jump event at the 1991 IAAF World Championships in Tokyo, Japan. There were a total of 38 participating athletes, with two qualifying groups and the final held on Monday August 26, 1991.

Schedule
All times are Japan Standard Time (UTC+9)

Final

Qualifying round
Held on Sunday 1991-08-25 with the mark set at 17.00 metres

See also
 1990 Men's European Championships Triple Jump
 1992 Men's Olympic Triple Jump
 1993 Men's World Championships Triple Jump

References
 Results

T
Triple jump at the World Athletics Championships